The Leinster Chess Championship is an annual chess competition in Ireland, which was first played in 1912. It is run by the Leinster Chess Union and the winner is declared Leinster Champion. In recent years the competition has been in conjunction with another tournament, the City of Dublin (1999), the Irish Open (2001, 2003) and since 2012 as part of the Malahide Millennium Chess tournament.

Winners
 1912 – Charles J. Barry (Sackville) 
 1913 – Charles J. Barry (Sackville)
 1914 – Charles J. Barry (Sackville)
 1915-1919 No championship during First World War
 1920 – Norman H. Wallace (Dublin) 
 1921 – Thomas George (T.G.) Cranston (Dublin)
 1922 – Philip Baker (Sackville)
 1924 – J.T. Gerrard
 1925 – J. J. Doyle
 1926 – Philip Baker
 1928 – Ralph Theodore (R.T.) Varian
 1929 – Patrick J. Laracy
 1930 – J.T. Gerrard (U.C.D.)
 1931 – Patrick J. Laracy (Dublin)
 1933 – C. J. Barry (Sackville)
 1934 – C. J. Barry (Sackville)
 1935 – John (J.J.) O'Hanlon (Blackrock)
 1936 – Thomas Cox (Blackrock)
 1937 – Thomas Cox (Blackrock)
 1938 – Thomas Cox (Dublin)
 1940 – Gerard Kerlin (Sackville)
 1941 – Gerard Kerlin (Sackville)
 1946 – Paddy A. Duignan
 1950 – Paddy A. Duignan (Sackville)
 1951 – Austin Bourke (Colmcille)
 1952 – Michael Schuster (Dublin)
 1953 – Oscar Aiden Quigley (Dublin)
 1954 – J.J. Walsh (Clontarf)
 1955 – William Stanton (Eoghan Ruadh)
 1956 – William Stanton (Eoghan Ruadh)
 1957 – William Stanton (Eoghan Ruadh)
 1958 – Matt Ryan (Sackville)
 1959 – Michael Littleton (U.C.D.)
 1960 – Dónal Déiseach (Sackville)
 1961 – J.J. Walsh (Dublin)
 1962 - P. J. Murphy (Eoghan Ruadh)
 1963 – Michael Littleton
 1964 – Tony Dennehy (Dublin)
 1965 – Wolfgang Heidenfeld (Dublin)
 1966 – Paul Cassidy (Kevin Barry) and Ray Cassidy (Eoghan Ruadh)
 1967 – Eamon Keogh (Eoghan Ruadh)
 1968 – Michael Littleton (Collegians) and Ken O’Riordan (Collegians)
 1969 – Eamon Keogh (Eoghan Ruadh) and Wolfgang Heidenfeld (Dublin)
 1970 – Eamon Keogh
 1971 – Eamon Keogh (Ierne)
 1972 – Wolfgang Heidenfeld
 1973 – Ray Cassidy and Bernard Kernan
 1974 – Ray Cassidy and Anthony (Tony) Doyle
 1975 – David Dunne
 1976 – Denis Healy
 1977 – David Dunne
 1978 – John Gibson
 1979 – Tony Doyle
 1980 – Paul Delaney (Rahney)
 1981 – Tony Doyle (Rathfarnham)
 1982 – Tony Doyle
 1983 – Colm Barry, Kevin McHugh, Padraig O Tuathill
 1984 – Pat Carton (Rahney), Joe Noone (Sandymount)
 1985 – Eugene Curtin (Dundrum)
 1986 – John Delaney (Sandymount)
 1987 – Joe Ryan (Dún Laoghaire)
 1989 – Jim McCarthy
 1990 – Stephen Brady (Phibsboro)
 1991 – Colm Daly
 1992 – Gerry O'Connell (St. Benildus) 
 1993 – Colm Barry and Gerard MacElligott (Elm Mount)
 1994 – Gerard MacElligott (Elm Mount)
 1995 – Joe Ryan (Dún Laoghaire) and Carles Battaghini
 1997 – Stephen Brady (Phibsboro) and Colm Daly
 1999 – Mark Quinn – Run as part of City of Dublin
 2001 – Daire McMahon (Crumlin) and Colm Daly – Run as part of Irish Open
 2002 - Joe Ryan (Phibsboro)
 2003 - Stephen Brady (Phibsboro) – Run as part of Irish Open
 2004 - Jörg Weidemann FM
 2005 – Alexander Baburin GM (Kilkenny)
 2006 – Karl McPhillips (Dublin University)
 2007 – Gavin Wall IM
 2008 – David Fitzsimons (Elm Mount)
 2009 – Not held
 2010 – David Fitzsimons (Elm Mount)
 2011 – John Joyce (Bray/Greystones) 
Run as part of the Malahide Millennium:
 2012 – Colm Daly (Bray/Greystones)
 2013 – Juri Firstov (Phibsboro)
 2014 – John Delaney (Blanchardstown Juniors)
 2015 – Colm Daly FM (Bray/Greystones)
 2016 – Colm Daly FM (Bray/Greystones)
 2017 – Mel O'Cinneide (St. Benildus)
 2018 – Colm Daly FM (Bray/Greystones)
 2019 – Gavin Melaugh (Dublin University)

References

Championship
Chess competitions
1912 in chess
1912 establishments in Ireland
Recurring sporting events established in 1912